Iltayevo (İltäy) is a rural locality (a village) in Yangatausky Selsoviet, Salavatsky District, Bashkortostan, Russia. The population was 153 as of 2010. There are 2 streets.

Geography 
Iltayevo is located 40 km north of Maloyaz (the district's administrative centre) by road. Komsomol is the nearest rural locality.

References 

Rural localities in Salavatsky District